Malaxis excavata  is a species of orchid widespread across much of Mesoamerica and South America from Mexico to Argentina. It has green flowers in a flat-topped array.

References

Orchids of South America
Orchids of Central America
Orchids of Mexico
Plants described in 1838
excavata